TSSA may refer to:

 Transport Salaried Staffs' Association
 Technical Standards and Safety Authority